Philippine Broadcasting Service (PBS), also known by its government agency Bureau of Broadcast Services (BBS) (Filipino: Kawanihan ng mga Serbisyong Pambrodkast), is a state radio network owned by the Philippine government under the Presidential Communications Office (PCO).

PBS operates national radio brands: Radyo Pilipinas 1, Radyo Pilipinas 2, Radyo Magasin, Republika FM1 and Capital FM2, as well as international shortwave station Radyo Pilipinas Worldwide. PBS, along with its television network counterparts People's Television Network and Intercontinental Broadcasting Corporation, which forms the media arm of the PCO.

As one of the attached agencies of the OPS, the PBS-BBS receives funding from the General Appropriations Act (Annual National Budget) and sales from blocktimers and advertisers, among others.

History

Commonwealth and Third Republic
On May 8, 1933, the United States-sponsored Insular Government established and operated radio station DZFM (then KZFM) in the Philippines on the frequency of 710 kilohertz with a power of 10,000 watts through the United States Information Service. In 1944, during the liberation campaign. In September 1946, two months after the Philippines became a republic, KZFM was turned over to the Philippine government. With the transfer was born the Philippine Broadcasting Service (PBS), the second broadcasting organization after Manila Broadcasting Company.

KZFM first operated under the Department of Foreign Affairs until it was transferred to the Radio Broadcasting Board (RBB), created by President Manuel Quezon on September 3, 1937. In 1947, an International Telecommunications Conference in Atlantic City, New Jersey, assigned the letter "D" to replace "K" as the first call letter for all radio stations in the Philippines. On January 1, 1952, the RBB was abolished to give way to the establishment of the Philippine Information Council (PIC) which assumed the function of the RBB, including the operation of DZFM. On July 1, 1952, after the PIC was abolished, DZFM and the Philippine Broadcasting Service (PBS) operated under the Office of the President. In 1959, the both were placed under the newly created Department of Public Information (DPI).

Years hence, the PBS acquired 13 more radio stations, one TV station, DZFM-TV Channel 10 which it time-shared with two other organizations, and changed its name to Bureau of Broadcast Services. September 13 is marked as the anniversary of the PBS.

In the 1960s, PBS expanded to the key provinces with DZEQ in Baguio, DYMR in Cebu, DYCI in Iloilo, DXRP in Davao and DZMQ in Dagupan.

Martial law and into the Fifth Republic
At the same time that the BBS creating its network, another government organization was building up its broadcast capability to rival, or in some instances, complement, that of the BBS. The National Media Production Center (NMPC) had acquired the facilities of Voice of America in Malolos, Bulacan in 1965 and steadily brought the old complex up to standards by a steady overhaul, fine-tuning, and outright replacement of outmoded equipment and machines. The NMPC operated the “Voice of the Philippines” (VOP), on both medium wave-920 kHz and shortwave 9.810 mHz transmissions. In 1975, the NMPC obtained DZRB-FM. With this new station and some provincial stations that came under its wings earlier, the NMPC was a network and effectively covered a wide range of the Philippine listenership.

In the 1970s, public broadcasting in the Philippines was thus represented by the BBS and the NMPC and catered to the educational and cultural needs of its audiences while endeavoring to keep it entertained with fare from indigenous material. Public service features were the keystone of its programs.

During the final months of Martial Law, both the BB and the NMPC were brought under one administrative roof in 1980 when the Office of Media Affairs was created to provide a loose union for both networks within the Broadcast Plaza along Bohol (now Sgt. Esguerra) Avenue in Diliman, Quezon City. It was not an ideal situation, since, as there had been no clear guidelines on the proper implementation of their respective operational strategies, the BB and the NMPC often squabbled, to the detriment of public broadcasting goals. Unification had created more problems for the OMA to overcome.

After the EDSA Revolution, the Office of Media Affairs was abolished, followed by both the NMPC and the BB. Under Executive Order No. 297, on the basis of the OMA, President Corazon Aquino reestablished the Bureau of Broadcast Services (BBS) and reinstated PBS as the network under the Office of the Press Secretary's control, which led to the formation of a national radio service based on the stations in which both the NMPC and BBS had, with the PBS hosting two national AM stations and a national FM station in Manila and a number of provincial owned-and-operated and affiliate stations in the country's administrative regions.

During the last months of the Aquino administration, PBS along with its TV counterpart, People's Television Network transferred its offices from ABS-CBN Broadcasting Center complex to PIA/Media Center Building in Visayas Avenue, Quezon City on January 22, 1992.

On January 2, 1995, PBS relaunched its flagship station (DZFM) as Radyo ng Bayan.

During the first years in the administration of President Benigno Aquino III, the PBS-BBS was transferred to the newly created Presidential Communications Operations Office (PCOO), after the OPS was abolished.

In the beginning of 2017, PBS relaunched its FM radio service with the relaunch of FM2 and the debut of FM1 as well, forming the basis of the national FM radio division under the agency, which was later reinforced by the launch of FM1 Davao, the first state-owned regional FM radio station serving Metro Davao.

On June 5, 2017, as part of the network's 70th anniversary, PBS relaunched its flagship brand Radyo ng Bayan as Radyo Pilipinas. Three months later, on September 18, sports station DZSR merged its programming with infotainment/cultural station DZRM and became Radyo Pilipinas Dos.

On July 16, 2018, PBS-BBS and the Global Satellite Technology Services Inc. (G Sat) signed a Memorandum of agreement allowing PBS-BBS to add its channels to its G Sat radio channel line up.

In October 2019, China donated over PHP130 million worth of radio broadcast equipment to the PCOO's Philippine Broadcasting Service (PBS). The donation includes live broadcast room equipment, FM broadcast transmitter equipment, and medium wave transmitter equipment. The Presidential Communications Operations Office (PCOO) will soon begin the rehabilitation of at least 14 (10 AM and four FM station) PBS Radyo Pilipinas stations nationwide. In 2021, the PBS welcomed a new network into the ranks - Radio Kidlat, a community radio network owned and operated by provincial electric cooperatives.

During his first State of the Nation Address, President Rodrigo Duterte announced that Congress would pass a proposed law merging the PBS with its TV counterpart, People's Television Network to form the "People's Broadcasting Corporation (PBC)", which serves a unified broadcasting entity of the republic encompassing radio, television, print and online media.

Platforms

Radyo Pilipinas
Radyo Pilipinas (formerly known as Radyo ng Bayan), the flagship AM radio station of PBS-BBS, is situated at 738 kHz on the AM band in Metro Manila with a power of 50 kW, and a network of over 32 local/regional stations in the provinces. The station broadcasts on weekdays from 5:30 a.m. to 12 midnight and weekends from 6 a.m. to 10 p.m. As the government's flagship radio station, it serves as a medium of development communication, a conduit between the government and the people, aiming to mobilize all sectors of society towards development and nationalism. Live, up-to-the-minute government news, live coverages of press conferences, as well as relevant information from different government sectors are featured here on this station.

Radyo Pilipinas Dos (formerly known as Sports Radio) is situated at 918 kHz on the AM band with a power of 50 kW. The station operates from 6 a.m. to 8 p.m. Mondays through Saturdays and from 6 a.m. to 9 p.m. on Sundays. RP2 mainly airs sports talk programming and a few non-sports content such as morning simulcasts of RP1 and music-oriented shows every weekend. Since 2023, the coverage of live PBA games are also broadcast here.

Radyo Magasin is situated at 1278 kHz on the AM band with a power of 10 kW. The station operates daily from 6 a.m. to 8 p.m. Radyo Magasin mainly airs culture-oriened programming and music-oriented shows every weekend. On October 5, 2020, PBS resumed the broadcast operations of DZRM.

Radyo Pilipinas [Worldwide] (DZRP) is the network's official external radio station broadcasting on both shortwave and internet streaming, which caters to the Overseas Filipino Workers and Filipino communities around the world. The station operates daily from 11:30 p.m. to 12 noon PST (15:30–04:00 UTC). RP Worldwide's main programming consists of 2–3 hours of broadcast in Filipino and English languages, and is transmitted via shortwave through the facilities of Voice of America in Tinang, Tarlac.

The current station manager of Radyo Pilipinas is Alan Allanigue, while the current station manager of Radyo Pilipinas Dos is Cecille Quimlat, and the current station manager of Radyo Pilipinas Worldwide is Rey Sampang.

FM division
In 2016, radio veteran Rizal "Sonny B" Aportadera, Jr. was appointed by then-PCOO Secretary Martin Andanar as the Director General of the Philippine Broadcasting Service (PBS). Aportadera spearheaded the establishment of its FM networks: FM1 and FM2.

Republika FM1 is PBS' music station, focused on contemporary hit radio (Top 40) and the local music. The station is situated at 87.5 MHz in Metro Manila and 87.9 MHz in Davao City, and is planning to expand in major cities in the country including: Cebu, Cagayan de Oro, Bacolod, Iloilo, Baguio, Bohol, Boracay, General Santos, Laoag, Butuan and Zamboanga. Republika FM1 Manila and Davao are both led by Hariett "Joe Fisher" Saniel as station manager.

Capital FM2 is PBS' music station focused on classic hits from the 80s and 90s, as well as 2000s. It is situated at 104.3 MHz in Metro Manila, and is recognized as the number one niche radio station in the A/B/C market based on Nielsen Ratings. Capital FM2 is led by Nigel "Nigel Grey" Gamalong as station manager.

New Media Unit
, the FM division's stations are becoming more and more active in the social media spaces. In line with this, the New Media Unit was formed headed by Deputy Director General Joan Marie Sy-Domingo. The New Media Unit is the in-house graphic design and social media marketing group for Republ1ka FM1 and Capital FM2. They are the dynamic group responsible for consistently and constantly releasing relevant and engaging social media content.

The New Media Unit is also the group that produces the Republikast shows aired on Republ1ka FM1's social media channels on Facebook, Instagram and YouTube. The shows are Fresh 1, Juan On 1 and FM1 Spotlight published weekly. There is also FM1 Spotlight: Livecast Edition broadcast live on Facebook and YouTube. Its schedule varies according to artists' availability.

At the beginning of imposed community quarantines due to the COVID-19 pandemic in 2020, the New Media Unit were engaged in delivering and posting relevant content to inform its audience of minimum health standards and other government announcements in relation to the quarantines and other health protocols.

PBS Stations
The following is a list of radio stations owned and affiliated by PBS.

Radyo Pilipinas

FM Stations

Affiliate stations
The following stations are owned by their perspective local government units or organizations. Though PBS is listed by the NTC as their owners, it acts as their affiliates.

Radyo Kidlat stations
The following stations are owned by their perspective local electrical cooperatives. It was launched in 2021.

Overseas Broadcast (Shortwave)

See also
People's Television Network
Filipinas, Ahora Mismo
List of radio stations in the Philippines

References

External links
PBS Website
Live Streaming for PBS Stations

Philippine Broadcasting Service
1947 establishments in the Philippines
Philippine radio networks
Radio stations in the Philippines
People's Television Network
Presidential Communications Group (Philippines)
State media